Wreford is an unincorporated community in Geary County, Kansas, United States.

History
A post office was opened in Wreford in 1882, and remained in operation until it was discontinued in 1918.

Demographics
Wreford is part of the Manhattan, Kansas Metropolitan Statistical Area.

Education
The community is served by Chapman USD 473 public school district.

References

Further reading

External links
 Geary County maps: Current, Historic, KDOT

Unincorporated communities in Kansas
Unincorporated communities in Geary County, Kansas
Manhattan, Kansas metropolitan area